The Order "For Personal Courage" was established by Presidium of the Supreme Soviet of the USSR on December 28, 1988.

This decoration could be awarded to any USSR citizen showing outstanding courage and bravery during life-saving, keeping of public order and safeguard of state property, as well as for fighting crime, environmental catastrophes, and other exceptional events.

The award was designed by Alexander Zhuk and represents a silver gilded silver star with the words "For Personal Courage" and "USSR" written on it. It was replaced in Russia by the Order of Courage in 1994, which has different look. The Russian version was only awarded at least 100 times, while the previous version was awarded 529 times. Many medals were made, but were mostly unissued.

The order was first awarded on  February 3, 1989, to a teacher of school No. 42 in the city of Ordzhonikidze (now Vladikavkaz) Natalia Vladimirovna Efimova. Her class was taken hostage and later freed in a police operation.

References 

 This article incorporates material from Russian Wikipedia
 A. N. Volodin and N. M. Merlay, Medals of the USSR, Saint-Petersburg, Pechatnyi dvor, 1997

Civil awards and decorations of the Soviet Union
Civil awards and decorations of Russia
Courage awards
Awards established in 1988
Awards disestablished in 1994